The State Committee for of Housing and Building Oversight is an agency of the government of Bashkortostan, headquartered with Ministry of Housing and Communal Services  in 28 Khalturin street, Ufa.
After the 2015 Chief of the State Committee has been Ildar Shafikov.

References

External links
 Official Website in Russian

Politics of Bashkortostan